The Return of Saint Luke is a 1970 Soviet crime film directed by Anatoliy Bobrovsky.

Plot 
A recidivist thief escapes from prison, steals the Holy Luke picture and wants to sell it. Colonel Zorin will try to stop the thief.

Cast 
 Vsevolod Sanaev as Colonel Zorin
 Vladislav Dvorzhetskiy as Mikhail Karabanov
 Oleg Basilashvili as Loskutov, an engineer
 Yekaterina Vasilyeva as Polina
 Natalya Rychagova as Zoya
 Valeri Ryzhakov as Sergei
 Vladimir Smirnov as Ievlev
 Valeri Belyakov as Kulikov
 Pauls Butkevics as Keit, a foreign tourist (as Paul Butkevich)
 Dmitriy Masanov as Karavashkin

References

External links 
 

1970 films
1970s Russian-language films
Soviet crime films
1970s crime films
Mosfilm films